Catita es una dama is a 1956 Argentine comedy film directed by Julio Saraceni and starring Niní Marshall.

Plot 
On this occasion, the trio made up of Catita, Semillita and Augusto Codecá (who plays an amateur boxer), after the conventillo has burned down due to Catita's negligence, take all the tenants of the tenement to live temporarily in their employer's house, A millionaire. This gives rise to numerous entanglements, and they even summon spirits due to their misinterpretation of their patron's death in a mistaken plane crash.

Cast
 Niní Marshall as Catita 
 Augusto Codecá 
 Carlos Estrada 
 Semillita 
 Rolando Dumas
 Mirtha Naredo 
 Esperanza Otero 
 Berta Ortegosa 
 Lilian Valmar 
 María Esther Corán 
 Odina Narietta 
 Marta González
 Luis Corradi
 Héctor Rivera
 Carlos Tomkinson
 Luis Calan
 Domingo Mania

References

External links
 

1956 films
1950s Spanish-language films
Argentine black-and-white films
1956 comedy films
Films directed by Julio Saraceni
Argentine comedy films
1950s Argentine films